The Bangladesh cricket team toured India to play three Twenty20 Internationals (T20Is) against the Afghanistan cricket team in Dehradun.

Afghanistan won the first two matches of the series, therefore giving them an unassailable lead. This gave them their first bilateral T20I series win against another Test team other than Zimbabwe. Afghanistan went on to win the series 3–0.

Background 
Originally the matches were scheduled to be played as One Day Internationals (ODIs), but the Bangladesh Cricket Board (BCB) agreed to change the fixtures to T20Is in preparation for the 2020 ICC World Twenty20 tournament. In May 2018, the Afghanistan Cricket Board (ACB) confirmed that all three matches will be played at the Rajiv Gandhi International Cricket Stadium. These were the first international cricket matches to be played at the venue.

Ahead of the T20Is, Bangladesh played a practice match against Afghanistan A.

Prior to this series, Afghanistan and Bangladesh had only played each other once before in a T20I, in the group stage of the 2014 ICC World Twenty20 tournament, with Bangladesh winning by nine wickets.

Squads

Ahead of the series, Mustafizur Rahman was ruled out of Bangladesh's squad due to injury. Abul Hasan was named as his replacement. Hazratullah Zazai was added to Afghanistan's squad ahead of the first T20I.

Tour match

Practice match:Afghanistan A vs Bangladesh

T20I Series

1st T20I

2nd T20I

3rd T20I

References

External links
 Series home at ESPN Cricinfo

2018 in Afghan cricket
2018 in Bangladeshi cricket
International cricket competitions in 2018
International cricket tours of India
Afghan cricket tours of India
Bangladeshi cricket tours of India